Synodus fuscus is a species of lizardfish that lives mainly in the Northwest Pacific Ocean.

References
 

Synodontidae
Fish described in 1917